Margarida Teresa da Silva e Orta (1711-1793) was a Brazilian author of the Enlightenment era. She was born in São Paulo and moved with her parents to Portugal at the age of six, where she remained for the rest of her life. Her chief work is Maximas de Virtude e Formosura (Maxims of Virtue and Beauty), published in Lisbon in 1752 and reissued in 1777 under the title Aventuras de Diófanes. Based on Fénelon's novel Télémaque, it contains a criticism of royal absolutism, recommending instead that the king should follow a policy of enlightened paternalism.

References

C. R. Boxer: Women in Iberian Expansion Overseas: Some Facts, Fancies and Personalities (Oxford University Press, 1975)

Portuguese writers
1711 births
1793 deaths